Electric Frankenstein is an American punk revival band from New Jersey, founded by Sal Canzonieri in 1990. The band relocated to North Carolina in 2021. Their style is a mixture of punk rock, hard rock, garage rock, glam, and heavy metal. It is called High Energy Rock & Roll. In Europe it is called Action Rock.

History

Electric Frankenstein has sometimes been referred to as AC/DC meets The Dead Boys - high energy rock and roll that combines the raw and energetic sounds of punk rock with elements of hard rock played by bands like MC5 and the Stooges.

Electric Frankenstein proved to be highly influential, helping to spark a rock revival. The band has found favor not only with the punk rock crowd but the stoner crowd as well. 
 
The band was first formed in 1989 from the breakup of a band called the Thing. They continued to develop their sound between 1990 and 1991, by brothers Sal and Dan Canzonieri (a.k.a., Danny Frankenstein). With Sal on guitar and Dan on bass, their first line-up was with Frankie Orlandoni on vocals, Jim Foster on lead guitar and John Caton on drums. Within one year, Steve Miller took over as singer/vocalist and eventually also played lead guitar. Miller took time off while recording a side project, and Scott Wilkins of Verbal Abuse and Condemned to Death took over vocals for two years, after which Steve Miller returned on vocals and lead guitar. John Steele and Rob Sefcik took over alternately playing drums during the last 15 years. They developed a strong following in New York City and by 1995, they toured nationally and internationally. After releasing singles on a handful of independent labels, they released their first vinyl EP, The Time Is Now, in 1995. The EP was also released on CD with added tracks from 7-inch singles as their first full-length album. Since then, they have released over 10 albums with almost every album being released on a different label. Notably, the band toured and recorded with Rik L Rik between 1996-1998, covering some of his songs and recording new material together.

Canzonieri later created the critically acclaimed series of compilations called "A Fistful of Rock & Roll", which aimed to collect and highlight all of the best of the new rock bands, collectively known as the New Rock Revolution. There have been 13 volumes of the series so far, published on various record labels (Tee Pee Records, Victory Records, and Steel Cage Records). A second series followed known as "A Fistful More of Rock & Roll", which is ongoing, featuring over 20 volumes.

Electric Frankenstein released an art book containing their record covers and concert posters, designed by underground artists including Coop, Kozik, Johnny Ace, Art Chantry, Dirty Donny and Peter Bagge. The book was titled, Electric Frankenstein - High Energy Punk Rock & Roll Poster Art and was published by Dark Horse Books.

A second book documenting their second decade of artwork was released: Son of Electric Frankenstein - More High Energy Rock Art.

A third book illustrating EF's first 125 songs was published as Electric Frankenstein: Illustrated Lyrics (Clover Press / Yoe Books).

Previous bands

Lead guitarist Jim Foster was an original guitarist for Adrenalin OD.

Bassist Dan Canzonieri played with The Shadow Project and Christian Death, both bands featuring original vocalist Rozz Williams.

Founding member rhythm guitarist Sal Canzonieri was in the band called The Thing from the mid-1980s into the early-1990s. The Thing were part of the early East Coast stoner rock scene. The Thing played live shows at CBGB and the Continental, featuring strobe lights, smoke, dancers, film projection, pyrotechnics and more. Their shows later inspired White Zombie. The band grew popular in New York City and Europe, and toured the United Kingdom in 1991, where they recorded a John Peel Session for the BBC, produced by Dale Griffin (drummer from Mott the Hoople), which was released on vinyl by Dutch East India Records - Peel Sessions series.

Members

Current
 Johnny Flude (vocals)
 Ed Warner (lead guitar)
 Sal Canzonieri (guitar)
 Dan Canzonieri (bass)
 Wheez Von Klaw (drums)

Former
 Steve Miller (vocals) - from Crash Street Kids, Cherry Thirteen
 Scott Wilkins (vocals) - from Verbal Abuse, Hollywood Hate, Infamous Stiffs.
 Rik L Rik (vocals) - from F-Word and Negative Trend
 Frankie Orlandoni (vocals) (first singer, before Steve Miller)

 Jim Foster (guitar) - from Adrenalin O.D.
 Carl Porcaro (guitar) - from Killing Time

 Chris Lynn (bass) from Hudson Falcons
 Bill Gill (bass)
 Mike Mindless Ruggerio (bass) from the Skulls
 Johnny Yeagher (bass) - from Zodiac Panthers, Ironhead, the Candy Snatchers, Thunderlip
 Sean O' Brien (bass)
 Drew Benfante (bass)
 Paul Perez (bass) from Black Novas

 Rubin Badillo (drums)
 Mike Lincoln (drums)
 John Steele (drums)
 Rob Sefcik (drums)
 Joel Gausten (drums) from Pigface
 Joey Rudacil (drums) (RIP)
 Joe Martin (drums) from Kill Your Idols
 Eric Arce (drums) from Murphy's Law
 Rene Valentine (drums) - from Joey Ramone's band, the Resistance, Hari Kari, Jim Marcus of Die Warzau, Pigface
 John Caton (drums) (first drummer)

Discography

Albums 
 Conquers the World (1995) Get Hip Records LP / One Foot Records CD
 Time is Now (1996)Demolition Derby Records LP / One Foot Records CD
 Sick Songs (US) Get Hip Records LP - One Foot Records CD / Action High (UK) One Louder Records (1997), featuring Scott Wilkins of Verbal Abuse on vocals
 Spare Parts (1998) Get Hip Records, featuring Scott Wilkins of Verbal Abuse on vocals
 Rock 'n' Roll Monster (1999) Au Go Go Records, featuring Rik L Rik of F-Word on vocals
 How to Make a Monster (1999) Victory Records
 Annie's Grave (US) Victory Records / Don't Touch Me, I'm Electric (UK) Twenty Stone Blatt Records (2000)
 The Buzz of 1000 Volts! (2001) Victory Records
 Burn Bright, Burn Fast! (2005) TKO Records (1st printing) / Little T&A Records (2nd printing) / Zodiac Killer Records (3rd printing)

References

External links
 
 
Electric Frankenstein Interview – HorrorGarage.com

1991 establishments in New Jersey
American garage rock groups
Indie rock musical groups from New Jersey
Garage punk groups
Horror punk groups
Musical groups established in 1991
Punk rock groups from New Jersey
Victory Records artists
Au Go Go Records artists
Man's Ruin Records artists